The Boy Who Harnessed the Wind is a 2019 British drama film written, directed by and starring Chiwetel Ejiofor in his feature directorial debut. The film is based on the memoir of the same name by William Kamkwamba and Bryan Mealer. It was screened in the Premieres section at the 2019 Sundance Film Festival and began streaming in most territories on Netflix on 1 March 2019. It was selected as the British entry for the Best International Feature Film at the 92nd Academy Awards, but it was not nominated. It received widely positive reviews with praise going to Ejiofor's direction and the acting.

Plot
Born in Kasungu, Malawi, William Kamkwamba is a young schoolboy who comes from a family of farmers who live in the nearby village of Wimbe. William has a talent for fixing radios for his friends and neighbours and spends his free time looking through the local junkyard for salvageable electronic components. Although he is soon banned from attending school due to his parents' inability to pay his tuition fees, William blackmails his science teacher (who is in a secret relationship with William's sister) into letting him continue attending his class and have access to the school's library where he learns about electrical engineering and energy production.

By the mid-2000s, the family's crops fail due to drought and the resulting famine devastates William's village, leading to riots over government rationing. William's family is also robbed of their already meager grain stores. People soon begin abandoning the village, and William's sister elopes with his former teacher in order to leave her family "one less mouth to feed".

Seeking to save his village from the drought, William devises a plan to build a windmill to power the town's broken water pump. His small prototype works successfully, but to build a larger windmill, William requires his father, Trywell, to give permission to dismantle the family bicycle for parts, which is the only bicycle in the village and the family's last major asset. His father believes the exercise futile and destroys the prototype and forces William to toil in the fields. After William's dog dies of starvation and hope seems lost, William's mother, Agnes, intervenes and urges his father to reconsider. William and his father reconcile after William buries his dog. With the help of his friends and the few remaining members of the village, they build a full-size windmill which leads to a successful crop being sown.

Word of William's windmill spreads and he is awarded a scholarship to attend school, ultimately receiving a degree from Dartmouth College.

Cast
 Maxwell Simba as William Kamkwamba
 Chiwetel Ejiofor as Trywell Kamkwamba
 Aïssa Maïga as Agnes Kamkwamba
 Lily Banda as Annie Kamkwamba
 Robert Agengo as Jeremiah Kamkwamba
 Joseph Marcell as Chief Wimbe
 Noma Dumezweni as Edith Sikelo
 Lemogang Tsipa as Mike Kachibunda
 Philbert Falakeza as Gilbert Wimbe
 Kelvin Maxwell Ngoma as Charity
 Melvin Alusa as Justin Mitwa

Release
On 14 November 2018, Netflix acquired global distribution rights, excluding Japan, China, and the United Kingdom. The film had its world premiere at the 2019 Sundance Film Festival on 25 January 2019. It was later released on Netflix on 1 March 2019.

Reception
The website's critical consensus reads, "The Boy Who Harnessed the Wind earns its predictably uplifting arc through strong performances and impressive work from debuting director Chiwetel Ejiofor." On Metacritic, the film has a weighted average score of 68 out of 100, based on 18 critics, indicating "generally favorable reviews".

See also
 List of submissions to the 92nd Academy Awards for Best International Feature Film
 List of British submissions for the Academy Award for Best International Feature Film

References

External links
 

2019 films
2019 drama films
2019 biographical drama films
British biographical drama films
Malawian drama films
Chewa-language films
Films about poverty
Films based on biographies
Films about farmers
Films set in Malawi
Films scored by Antônio Pinto
Alfred P. Sloan Prize winners
Films about energy
Works about windmills
2010s English-language films
2010s British films